The Université de l’Ontario français (abbreviated as UOF) is a French-language public university in Toronto, Ontario, Canada. The university campus is situated in the East Bayfront neighbourhood of downtown Toronto, near the Toronto waterfront.

The university is the first stand-alone francophone university opened in the province, having been incorporated by the Legislative Assembly of Ontario in April 2018.  The institution offered its first academic certificate program in September 2019, and accepted its first cohort of full-time undergraduate students in 2021.

History 
Efforts to establish a Francophone university in Central and Southwestern Ontario date back to the 1970s and the demands gained political traction in the 2010s with several Franco-Ontarian groups, including the Francophone Assembly of Ontario, releasing a report that recommended the creation of a Francophone university within that region on 3 October 2014. A private member's bill to establish a Francophone university was later introduced in the Legislative Assembly of Ontario on 26 May 2015. However, the bill failed to pass as the legislature was prorogued. While the legislature was prorogued, a report released by the Advisory Committee on French-language Post-secondary Education in Central and Southwestern Ontario noted that post-secondary Francophone education was insufficient in central and southwestern Ontario, and recommended establishing a Francophone university within Greater Toronto to help rectify the issue.

On 22 September 2016, a provincial planning committee was created to help establish the institution, chaired by Dyane Adam, the former federal Commissioner of Official Languages, and made up of members from Toronto-based universities including Ryerson University and the University of Toronto; the president of the provincial French-language public broadcaster TFO; and members from Franco-Ontarian organizations. The legislation establishing the institution, the Université de l’Ontario français Act, 2017, received royal assent on 14 December 2017, and formally went into effect on 9 April 2018 at the same time as the appointment of the university's first board of governors. Normand Labrie was appointed by the board of governors as the university's interim president on 1 July 2018 and served until 30 June 2019. He was succeeded by Professor André Roy who was appointed president in August 2020. In February 2021, Roy resigned for personal reasons and the university's two vice-presidents at the time, Denis Berthiaume and Édith Dumont, served as the university's interim co-presidents until July 2021.

Following the 2018 Ontario general election, the newly formed Progressive Conservative government announced plans to cancel funding for the establishment of the institution. The question of funding became a major political issue for the new government among the province's Franco-Ontarian residents and it resonnated with francophones across the country. Franco-Ontarian Member of Provincial Parliament Amanda Simard crossed the floor from the Progressive Conservatives, eventually joining the Liberal party, citing the decision as part of the reason for her move. However, in September 2019, the governments of Ontario and Canada announced they had signed a memorandum of understanding, which would see both governments provide C$126 million to fund the institution over the following eight years.

The university offered its first academic program in September 2019, a graduate-level higher education pedagogy program for members of the teaching faculty at Collège La Cité. The university's first graduate certificates were issued for those who completed the program. In January 2021, it was announced the university had only received 19 applicants from Ontario secondary school students for admission into its Fall 2021 cohort, much lower than the expected 200 applicants. There were a total of 151 full-time undergraduate students enrolled at the university when classes began in September 2021.

Campus

The Université de l'Ontario français is situated in downtown Toronto, near the shoreline of Lake Ontario. The university campus is located at 9 Lower Jarvis Street, at the base of a high-rise in the East Bayfront neighbourhood of downtown Toronto. The university leases  of space within the building.

Administration
The bicameral system of the university's governance consists of two governing bodies: the Board of Governors and the Senate, both of which are established in the Université de l'Ontario français Act, 2017. The board of governors is responsible for governing and managing the university. The Board is made up of up to 13 external members (appointed by the Board and by Ontario's Lieutenant Governor in Council) and 9 internal members from the university's administration, faculty, and student body. The senate is responsible for the university's academic and education policy, including standards for admission and qualifications for degrees, diplomas, and certificates issued by the university.

The university's president and vice-chancellor serve as the university's chief executive officer. Pierre Ouellette was appointed by the board of governors as president in June 2021 and took office on 7 July 2021. The position was previously held by André Roy, who served as the university's president from August 2020 to February 2021. Denis Berthiaume and Édith Dumont served as interim co-presidents from Roy's departure to Ouellette's appointment. On 20 October 2021, the board of governors appointed Paul Rouleau as chancellor and titular head of the university.

Academics
French is used as the primary language of instruction. The institution is the first stand-alone Francophone university to open in Ontario. As French is the instructional language of the university, prospective students are required to have either taken three years of French language studies in secondary school or pass a French language proficiency test.

In November 2022, the university offered four Bachelor of Social Science degree programs. The university launched its Bachelor of Education program in January 2023.

See also 
 Education in Toronto
 Higher education in Ontario
 List of universities in Ontario

Notes

References

External links 
 Official website

2018 establishments in Ontario
Educational institutions established in 2018
French-language universities and colleges in Ontario
Universities and colleges in Toronto
Universities in Ontario
Franco-Ontarian history